The Ratings Game is a 1984 comedy cable television film directed by Danny DeVito and produced by David Jablin. The Showtime comedy stars DeVito and Rhea Perlman, and features Huntz Hall, Michael Richards, George Wendt and Jerry Seinfeld.

Plot
Vic DeSalvo and his brother Goody are successful New Jersey trucking magnates, but Vic has a desire to make it big as a Hollywood producer. He hawks his scripts and ideas from one network executive to another, but he is turned down at each attempt.

Finally, he meets an executive at a second-rate company who has just been fired for promoting a show that attracted zero viewers. To avenge himself, he accepts Vic's script and arranges for a pilot episode of Sittin' Pretty, to be filmed. The resultant episode is abysmally awful, both in acting and story, but Vic is only inspired to greater heights. The director and star actor walk out and Vic decides to act as well as write and direct.

He throws a huge party to make himself known to "le tout Hollywood", but no one comes, except Francine, a statistician at a ratings agency. They fall in love.

When Francine is passed over for a promotion by her philandering and incompetent boss, she reveals to Vic how the ratings system can be bypassed and results fixed by setting up confederates in Nielsen-ratings households to skew the results. They conspire to run a scam that will make Vic's program the most-watched on television.

The scam works and Vic is voted the best new actor at a grand awards ceremony, showing that many viewers (in addition to the confederates) watched his shows. But the agency has now discovered the scam, and as soon as Vic has accepted his award, he is arrested by the police.

Francine and Vic are married in jail.

Cast
 Danny DeVito as Vic DeSalvo 
 Rhea Perlman as Francine Kester 
 Gerrit Graham as Parker Braithwaite
 Huntz Hall as Benny Bentson 
 Barry Corbin as The Colonel
 Louis Giambalvo as "Goody" DeSalvo
 Kevin McCarthy as Wes Vandergelder 
 Basil Hoffman as Frank Friedlander
 Michael Richards as Sal
 Vincent Schiavelli as Skip
 George Wendt as Mr. Sweeney
 Jason Hervey as Todd Sweeney
 Ron Rifkin as TV Director
 Jerry Seinfeld as Network Rep
 Jayne Meadows as herself
 Steve Allen as himself
 Allyce Beasley as Paisan Receptionist
 Selma Diamond as Francine's Mother

Production
The Ratings Game was the first original movie financed by Showtime. The feature also marks Danny DeVito's film directing debut. The film garnered a WGA Award for Best Original TV Comedy Movie, and an International TV Movie Festival Award for Best Comedy. Writers Michael Barrie and Jim Mulholland also won a Writers Guild Award for their script.

Jerry Seinfeld makes an early appearance in the cast of the film (his future Seinfeld co-star Michael Richards also appeared alongside him).

Home media
The Ratings Game was issued on VHS and Laserdisc by Paramount Home Video.

On July 19, 2016, Olive Films, a boutique distributor of classic and independent films, released The Ratings Game on DVD and Blu-Ray. It is a premium packaged "Special Edition" that has been restored in full HD from the one print in existence. The discs also include as extras the four short films directed by Danny DeVito prior to making his feature directing debut with The Ratings Game. Other special features include a behind-the-scenes featurette, the original trailer and some deleted scenes. It also includes a 28-page collectors booklet with detailed liner notes and art from the film.

A poor-quality bootleg version of this film has been widely distributed as The Mogul.

References

External links
 
 

1984 comedy films
1984 television films
1984 films
Films about television
Films directed by Danny DeVito
American comedy television films
Showtime (TV network) films
1980s American films